Dytryk (Theoderick) (born after 992 - died after 1032) – factual or titular district Duke of Poland. Grandson of Mieszko I and his second wife  Oda of Haldensleben.

Bibliography
 Balzer O., Genealogia Piastów, Kraków 1895.
 Jasiński K., Rodowód pierwszych Piastów, Poznań 2004, s. 126–127.
 Labuda G., Pierwsze państwo polskie, Kraków 1989, s. 54.
 Rymar E., Rodowód książąt pomorskich, Szczecin 2005, .
 Szczur S., Historia Polski. Średniowiecze, Kraków 2002, .

11th-century Polish monarchs
Piast dynasty
11th-century Christians
11th-century Polish people